The videography of American singer R. Kelly, consists of 90 music videos (60 as a lead artist and 30 as a featured artist), 7 cameo appearances, 1 commercial.

Music videos

1990s

As a lead artist

As a featured artist

Cameo appearances

2000s

As a lead artist

As a featured artist

Cameo appearances

2010s

As a lead artist

As a featured artist

Video albums

Filmography
This is a chronologically-ordered list of films and television shows in which R. Kelly has appeared.

Films

Commercials

References

Kelly, R